Wade Hampton (early 1750sFebruary 4, 1835) was an American soldier and politician. A two-term U.S. congressman, he may have been the wealthiest planter, and one of the largest slave holders in the United States, at the time of his death.

Biography
Born in the early 1750s, sources vary on Hampton's exact birth year, listing it as 1751, 1752, or 1754. He was the scion of the politically important Hampton family, which was influential in state politics almost into the 20th century. His second great-grandfather Thomas Hampton (1623–1690) was born in England and settled in the Virginia Colony. Thomas Hampton's father, William, a wool merchant, sailed from England and appears on the 1618 passenger list of the Bona Novo. The ship was blown off course and arrived in Newfoundland. It would arrive in Jamestown the following year, 1619. He would send for his wife and three children to arrive in Jamestown in 1620.

Military career
Hampton served in the American Revolutionary War as a captain in the 2nd South Carolina Regiment (1777-1781) and as the lieutenant colonel of a South Carolina volunteer cavalry regiment. He was a Democratic-Republican member of Congress for South Carolina from 1795 to 1797 and from 1803 to 1805, and a presidential elector in 1800.

He was appointed to the U.S. Army as colonel of Regiment of Light Dragoons in October 1808, and was promoted to brigadier general in February 1809, appointed as the top military officer in the Territory of Orleans.

He used the U.S. military presence in New Orleans to suppress the 1811 German Coast uprising, a slave revolt which he believed was a Spanish plot. In the same year, he purchased The Houmas, a sugar plantation in Ascension Parish, Louisiana. This may have been a gift for his daughter and son-in-law, as the son-in-law was managing the plantation by 1825.

During the War of 1812, Hampton commanded the American forces in the Battle of the Chateauguay in 1813, leading thousands of U.S. soldiers to defeat at the hands of a little over a thousand colonial Canadian militia and 180 Mohawk warriors, then getting his army lost in the woods.  On April 6, 1814, he resigned his commission and returned to South Carolina.

Later life
Thereafter, he acquired a large fortune through land speculation. Hampton had a mansion, now known as the Hampton-Preston House, which is listed on the National Register of Historic Places, in Columbia, South Carolina. At his death in the 1830s, it was said that he was the wealthiest planter in the U.S. and possessed some 3,000 slaves amongst his holdings. In his anti-slavery compendium American Slavery As It Is, Theodore Weld cites a witness who heard him boasting that he killed some of his slaves for a nutritional experiment. The witness represents Hampton's words as: "[T]hey died like rotten sheep!!"

Wade Hampton I is interred in the churchyard at Trinity Episcopal Church in Columbia, South Carolina's capital city.

His son Wade Hampton II and grandson Wade Hampton III also became prominent in South Carolina social and political circles.

Legacy
Fort Hampton, a fort in Alabama, was named in honor of General Hampton.

See also
List of slave owners

Notes

References

External links
 Wade Hampton in the Louisiana Historical Association's Dictionary of Louisiana Biography
 
 Wade Hampton Letter at The Historic New Orleans Collection

1750s births
1835 deaths
United States Army generals
United States Army personnel of the War of 1812
Battle of the Châteaugay veterans
1800 United States presidential electors
American people of English descent
Wade Hampton family
American planters
American slave owners
Democratic-Republican Party members of the United States House of Representatives from South Carolina